The Democratic Party "Saimnieks" was a Latvian centre-left political party formed through the merger of the Latvian Democratic Party and the political party "Saimnieks" in 1995. It won the 1995 parliamentary election and was represented by 18 deputies in the 6th Saeima. It participated in Andris Šķēle's first and second cabinet, withdrawing from the coalition in 1998.

The party lost the 1998 parliamentary election, failing to win any seats. It was eventually disbanded in March 2005.

Bibliography 
Mednis I. Partiju laiki Latvijā (1988–2002). — R.: Drukātava, 2007. ,  262.—270. lpp.

Footnotes 

Defunct political parties in Latvia
Political parties established in 1995
1995 establishments in Latvia
2005 disestablishments in Latvia
Political parties disestablished in 2005
Social democratic parties in Latvia